Lochmaeocles cornuticeps is a species of beetle in the family Cerambycidae. It was described by Schaeffer in 1906.

Subspecies
 Lochmaeocles cornuticeps cornuticeps Schaeffer, 1906
 Lochmaeocles cornuticeps federalis Dillon & Dillon, 1946
 Lochmaeocles cornuticeps pacificus Dillon & Dillon, 1946

References

cornuticeps
Beetles described in 1906